The Lichte is a right tributary of the Schwarza in Thuringia, Germany, and is  long.

Sources 
The Lichte rises as the Little Lichte in Neuhaus am Rennweg in the Thuringian Highland.

Course 
The Lichte flows north through the Thuringian Forest Nature Park, first through the Finsterer Grund (Dark Valley), where a now closed section of the Sonneberg – Probstzella single-track railway line passes over it on a viaduct. It then reaches the municipality of Lichte, which extends for approximately  along its banks. In the centre of Lichte (in the Wallendorf section) the Piesau joins the Lichte. The municipality of Unterweißbach borders the dam and extends for approximately  along the river, which then empties into the Schwarza to the west of the municipality at Mankenbachsmuehle.

The Lichte and Piesau both have unusually steep and deep gorges, the difference between hill tops and valley bottoms often exceeding .

Tributaries 

The rivers and streams in the area of the Lichte valley have been known for centuries for deposits of placer gold and are considered the most significant sources of gold in Germany. Recreational placer miners continue to find occasional gold nuggets.

See also 
 List of reservoirs and dams in Germany
 List of rivers of Thuringia

References 

Rivers of Thuringia
Lichte
Rivers of Germany